Leptobelistis is a genus of moths of the family Xyloryctidae.

Species
 Leptobelistis asemanta Turner, 1902
 Leptobelistis isthmodes (Meyrick, 1922)

References

Xyloryctidae
Xyloryctidae genera